Evgeniy Ivanovich Morozov (2 May 1944 – 1 December 2016) was a Soviet and Russian choirmaster and the founder and director of the .

Biography 
In 1961, Morozov graduated from the State Choir School with a degree in choir conducting. In 1965, he graduated from the choir department of the Moscow Conservatory. In 1973, he completed postgraduate studies at the Moscow Conservatory. At the same time, in 1963–1965 he worked as a choirmaster of the Palace of Culture at the Moscow Metallurgical Plant. In 1965, he worked as a singing teacher at secondary school No. 795 in Moscow.

From 1965, for more than 30 years, he worked in Petropavlovsk-Kamchatsky in Kamchatka Krai as a teacher and head of the conducting and choir department of the Kamchatka Regional Music School. In 1986, he initiated the creation of the Kamchatka Musical Spring festival (since 1995, an international festival). For more than 30 years, he headed the work of the Kamchatka branch of the Musical Society of Russia.

From 1979, he studied the musical folklore of the indigenous peoples of Kamchatka. He was the first person in Russia to write arrangements of Koryak, Aleut and Chukchi folk melodies for an academic choir.

Morozov was the author of the music for the anthem of Kamchatka Krai (2009, lyrics by the poet Boris Dubrovin).

Morozov died on 1 Decemember 2016 after a long illness.

Morozov had a daughter, Natalia.

Awards and recognition 
 Order of Honour (19 May 2005) – for services in the field of culture and art, many years of productive activity
 Order of Friendship of Peoples (1986)
  (28 April 1994) – for services in the field of art
 Honoured Cultural Worker of the RSFSR (1 February 1978) – for services in the field of Soviet culture
 Laureate of All-Russian festivals (1977–1998)
 Laureate of International Competitions (Greece, 1994; Spain, 1996)
 Kamchatka Regional State Prize (1995)
 Governor of Kamchatka Prize (1996)
 Honorary Citizen of Petropavlovsk-Kamchatsky (2000),  (2016)

References 

1944 births
2016 deaths
Russian choral conductors
Russian male conductors (music)
Soviet composers
Russian composers
20th-century composers
21st-century composers
Recipients of the Order of Honour (Russia)
Recipients of the Order of Friendship of Peoples
Moscow Conservatory alumni